David Mote (born October 3, 1940 - Siler City, North Carolina-died May 17, 2010) was a NASCAR Grand National driver who competed only in the 1968 season with 396 laps accumulated and  of racing completed. His first race was the 1968 Ashville 300 and his final race was the 1968 Northern 300. Mote's total winnings are $1,150 ($ when adjusted for inflation).

References
 Racing Reference

1940 births
People from Siler City, North Carolina
NASCAR drivers
Racing drivers from North Carolina
2010 deaths